A brook is a small river or natural stream of fresh water. It may also refer to:

Computing
Brook, a programming language for GPU programming based on C
Brook+, an explicit data-parallel C compiler
BrookGPU, a framework for GPGPU programming

People
Brook (surname)
People with the given name Brook, or nickname
Brook Benton (1931–1988), American singer and songwriter
Brook Hannah (1874–1961), Australian rules footballer and missionary
Brook Mahealani Lee (born 1971), former Miss USA and Miss Universe (1997) from Hawaii, U.S.
Brook Lopez, American basketball player
Brook Taylor (1685–1731), English mathematician of Taylor series fame
Brook, a persona of Mary J. Blige
Brook, a fictional character in the manga and anime One Piece

Places
 Brook, Indiana, United States
 Brook, Isle of Wight, England
 Brook, Kent, England
 Brook, Surrey, England
 Brook, a hamlet in the parish of Albury, Surrey
 Brook Islands, Australia
 Brook House Immigration Removal Centre, a detention centre near Gatwick Airport, England

Other uses
Brook (One Piece), a fictional skeleton from the anime and manga One Piece
Brook Advisory Centres, a British contraceptive services organisation

See also
Brock (disambiguation)
Brock (surname)
Brooke (disambiguation)
Brooks (disambiguation)
Bruck (disambiguation)
The Brook (disambiguation)